Reckard is a surname. Notable people with the surname include:

Frank Reckard (born 1952), American guitarist
Marshall Reckard (1901–1957), American mechanic and politician

See also
Rickard